Triprion  is a genus of frogs (the shovel-headed tree frogs) in the family Hylidae found in the Pacific lowlands of Mexico, the Yucatán Peninsula, and Guatemala. These frogs hide in tree-holes and plug the entrance with their strange-looking, bony heads.

Species
Three species in this genus are recognized:
 Triprion petasatus  - Yucatán shovel-headed tree frog
 Triprion spatulatus  - Mexican shovel-headed tree frog
 Triprion spinosus  - Spiny-headed tree frog

References

External links
 . 2007. Amphibian Species of the World: an Online Reference. Version 5.1 (10 October 2007). Triprion. Electronic Database accessible at http://research.amnh.org/herpetology/amphibia/index.php. American Museum of Natural History, New York, USA. (Accessed: Apr 24, 2008).
  [web application]. 2008. Berkeley, California: Triprion. AmphibiaWeb, available at http://amphibiaweb.org/. (Accessed: Apr 24, 2008).
  taxon Triprion at http://www.eol.org.
  Taxon Triprion at https://www.itis.gov/index.html. (Accessed: Apr 24, 2008).
  Taxon Triprion at http://data.gbif.org/welcome.htm

 
Hylinae
Amphibian genera
Taxa named by Edward Drinker Cope